Claude Alfred Jonnard (November 23, 1897 – August 27, 1959) was a professional baseball player.  He was a right-handed pitcher over parts of six seasons (1921–1924, 1926, 1929) with the New York Giants, St. Louis Browns and Chicago Cubs.  For his career, he compiled a 14–12 record in 137 appearances, most as a relief pitcher, with a 3.79 earned run average and 160 strikeouts.  Jonnard was a member of the Giants National League pennant-winning teams in 1923 and 1924, losing both World Series (to the New York Yankees and Washington Senators, respectively).  In World Series play, he made three relief appearances, giving up no runs.

Jonnard was born and later died in Nashville, Tennessee at the age of 61.  His twin brother, Bubber Jonnard, was a Major League catcher and coach.

See also
 List of Major League Baseball annual saves leaders

References

External links

1897 births
1959 deaths
Major League Baseball pitchers
Baseball players from Nashville, Tennessee
New York Giants (NL) players
St. Louis Browns players
Chicago Cubs players
Nashville Vols players
Lenoir Red Sox players
Minor league baseball managers